Yianni Diakomihalis (born John Michael Diakomihalis on April 11, 1999) is an American freestyle and folkstyle wrestler who competes at 65 kilograms and 149 pounds. In freestyle, he is the 2022 world silver medalist, a two-time US World Team member (2021 and 2022), the 2020 Pan American champion, the 2019 US Open national champion, and a two-time age-group world champion. As a collegiate wrestler, Diakomihalis was a four-time NCAA Division I national champion and four-time EIWA champion out of Cornell University.

Folkstyle career

High school 
Diakomihalis attended Hilton High School in Hilton, New York, along with his brother Greg, who would go on to become a five-time NYSPHSAA champion. He made the varsity team in the eighth grade (2013) and won the Division I state championship that same year at 99 pounds, defeating future Cornell teammate Vito Arujau in the finals. As a freshman, he also won the state title now at 113 pounds and that was repeated at 120 pounds as a sophomore. As a junior, he became one of the eight four-time NYSPHSAA champions in the history of the state of New York when he walked through the competition at 138 pounds. As a senior, he found himself unable to compete at the state championships after he suffered an injury that led him out of the tournament. He graduated in 2017 as a four-time NYSPHSAA champion with a 243–3 record on a win streak of 210 victories.

College 
As a high school sophomore (2014), Diakomihalis committed to Cornell University.

2017–2018 
As a freshman, Diakomihalis won the Bearcat Open, New York State Intercollegiate, and the Cliff Keen Invitational and compiled a record of 28-1 during the regular season. Post-regular-season, he won the EIWA championships and later went on to win the NCAA championship, joining Kyle Dake as the only Big Reds to do so in their "true freshman" year of competition and earning notable victories over #1 Bryce Meredith, #2 Jaydin Eierman, and two-time NCAA champion Dean Heil. Diakomihalis suffered a torn ACL during his quarterfinal matchup against #6 Heil.

2018–2019 
As a sophomore, Diakomihalis won the Mat Town Open I and the South Beach Individual and capped a perfect 13–0 record in dual matches, ending the regular season unbeaten. He went on to win his second EIWA championship and earned the Outstanding Wrestler award in the process. At the NCAA championships, he most notably defeated the #2, #3, and #5 ranked wrestlers in Jaydin Eierman, Joseph McKenna and Dominick Demas to claim the national title. Diakomihalis was named EIWA Top Wrestler and was a finalist for the Dan Hodge Trophy.

2019–2020 
Diakomihalis did not compete at the NCAA level in 2019–2020, as he took an Olympic redshirt year and focused on freestyle.

2020–2021 
Yianni planned to return to college wrestling in 2020–2021; however, the Ivy League announced the cancellation of all winter sports on November 13, 2020, due to the COVID-19 pandemic.

2021–2022 
After 975 days, Diakomihalis finally returned to the mat for the Big Red on November 20, 2021, defeating Stanford's Jaden Abas at 149 pounds. He finished 28-0 and won his third NCAA title (his first at 149 pounds).

2022–2023 
Diakomihalis finished his college career with his fourth title at the NCAA title in Tulsa (his second title at 149 pounds) with a 4-2 victory over Sammy Sasso of Ohio State University. Diakomihalis became the fifth wrestler in NCAA history, and the second from Cornell University, to win four NCAA titles.

Freestyle career

Age-group level 
Diakomihalis was an accomplished cadet freestyle wrestler, he was a two-time World champion and two-time UWW National champion. As a junior, he placed third at the 2016 UWW Nationals.

Senior level

2019 
After opting for the Olympic redshirt, Diakomihalis attended his first senior level tournament at the US Open in April. He went 6–0 (three technical falls) with notable wins over Frank Molinaro, Jordan Oliver and Zain Retherford in the finals.
Not long after, he competed in an exhibition match at the Beat the Streets charity event against multiple World medalist Bajrang Punia. He won the match on points (10–8).

After winning the US Open championship, Diakomihalis sat out of the World Team Trials Challenge, having earned himself an automatic spot at Final X: Rutgers with the US Open victory; US Open finalist Retherford won the World Team Trials Challenge to earn the other spot at Final X in June.  In the first match of the best-of three series, Diakomihalis fell 10-4. The second match ended controversially. Retherford was down 4–6 late in the match when he got a takedown for two points, while Diakomihalis was awarded two points for a back exposure to apparently win the match 8-6, as time expired while the wrestlers were still grappling. Retherford's corner challenged the points awarded to Diakomihalis and won the challenge, resulting in a final score of 6–6 with criteria advantage to Retherford, giving him a 2-0 lead in the series and an apparent victory at Final X. However, subsequent to the tournament, Diakomihalis initiated an arbitration challenging the scoring change. Diakomihalis ultimately prevailed in the arbitration with a finding that the scoring review was conducted improperly. The arbitrator awarded Diakomihalis a rematch of the second match in the series.

In July, Diakomihalis competed at the prestigious Yasar Dogu Grand Prix in Istanbul, Turkey. He defeated four opponents such as his Final X opponent Zain Retherford, Ali Rahimzade and Ismail Musukaev to claim the championship.

Two weeks later he went on to compete in the Waclaw Ziolkowski Memorial at Warsaw, Poland. He defeated four opponents (two technical falls) including Ismail Musukaev (by forfeit) to claim the championship.

In September, the rematch between Retherford and Diakomihalis took place in a special event called Final X: Yianni vs. Zain in Wilkes-Barre, Pennsylvania. Diakomihalis lost the bout on points, 2-1, losing his chance to represent the United States at the World Championships.

In December, he competed at the US Nationals. He defeated three opponents before getting upset by Joseph McKenna in the semifinals. He advanced to the finals of the consolation brackets but forfeited his final match.

2020 
In his first tournament of the year, Diakomihalis competed at the Pan American Championships. He defeated four opponents including Agustín Destribats and NCAA Division II champion Jose Rodriguez to claim the championship.

Diakomihalis was scheduled to compete at the US Olympic Team Trials on April 4–5 at State College, Pennsylvania. However, the event and the Olympics were postponed due to the COVID-19 pandemic, leaving him and all the qualifiers unable to compete.

After more than half a year without stepping on the mats, Diakomihalis wrestled at the annual Beat The Streets event against the heavily accomplished Vladimer Khinchegashvili on September 17. He lost the competitive and close match by criteria.

Diakomihalis represented the Spartan Combat Wrestling Club at 65 kilograms in the FloWrestling: RTC Cup on December 4–5. He tech'd 2020 Big Ten Championship runner-up Sammy Sasso (Ohio State) in the first round, followed up with two criteria victories over 2017 World Championship runner-up James Green (New Jersey) and got a final TF over 2018 NCAA All-American Tariq Wilson to help the team reach the third-place.

2021 
To start off the year, Diakomihalis wrestled two-time and reigning Pan American champion (70 kg) Anthony Ashnault on January 8, at the SCRTC I. After scoring two two-point takedowns and a step-out, he scored a five-point slam, driving Ashnault to a technical fall. Diakomihalis then competed at the Henri Deglane Grand Prix of France on January 16. After advancing to the semifinals with two wins, Diakomihalis faced World and Olympic champion Vladimer Khinchegashvili in a rematch from their BTS match, and was able to avenge his lone 2020 loss when he dominantly tech'd the Georgian, advancing to the finals, where he flawlessly defeated James Green, in a rubber match from their series at the RTC Cup, to claim gold.

Diakomihalis then competed at the America's Cup on February, defeating DI All-Americans Mitch McKee (twice) and Pat Lugo to help the Team Kenny Monday reach sixth place. On March, he defeated Matt Kolodzik in a dual match against the NJRTC.

In April 2–3, he competed at the rescheduled US Olympic Team Trials as the second seed, in an attempt to represent the United States at the 2020 Summer Olympics. After defeating the defending US Olympic Team Member Frank Molinaro, he was upset by third-seeded and 2019 US National champion Jordan Oliver, ending Diakomihalis' win streak. He came back to wrestle for third–place after defeating Mitch McKee, but was once again defeated, now by 2021 NCAA champion Nick Lee, placing fourth.

After his loss at the Olympic Trials, Diakomihalis came back at the prestigious Poland Open, where he was the defending champion, on June 9. In the second round, he was knocked off by Iszmail Muszukajev in a frenetic rematch from their also frenetic match in 2019. Next, he most notably dominated recently crowned Pan American Continental champion Joseph McKenna to a technical fall and defeated the same opponent he defeated in his first match, 2018 University World Champion Eduard Grigorew, winning the championship without getting the rubber match with Musukaev as Musukaev forfeited out of the tournament after their earlier match.

Diakomihalis then competed at the 2021 US World Team Trials from September 11 to 12, intending to represent the country at the World Championships. After dropping All-American Luke Pletcher to make the finale, Diakomihalis faced Joseph McKenna in a best-of-three match. After losing a razor-close first bout, he won the next two, including a dominant technical fall in order to become the 2021 US World Team member.

Diakomihalis represented the United States at the 2021 World Championships on October 3 in Oslo, Norway. After a dominant first round win over Italy, he was eliminated by 2020 Individual World Cup winner Vazgen Tevanyan on points.

2022 
In May, at the 2022 World Team Trials Challenge tournament, Diakomihalis defeated Luke Pletcher and Ian Parker, both by 10-0 technical superiority, to advance to Final X against Evan Henderson. 
 
At Final X in June at Madison Square Garden, Diakomihalis defeated Henderson 11-9 and 14-4 to win the best-of-three series and earn his second straight spot on Team USA for the World Championships.

At the 2022 World Championships in Belgrade, Diakomihalis made history as the first 65 kg US wrestler to earn a medal at the World Wrestling Championships since Bill Zadick in 2006. He advanced to the finals with three straight wins. He began with a 4-0 win over Vazgen Tevanyan of Armenia, avenging his loss at the 2021 World Championships. He followed that with a 10-0 win by technical superiority over Vladimir Dubov of Bulgaria. In the semifinals, he defeated Bajrang Punia of India by technical superiority, 10-0 to advance to the finals. His semifinal victory guaranteed him a silver medal and clinched the team title for the United States. In the finals, Diakomihalis was defeated by Rahman Amouzad of Iran by a score of 13-8, thereby claiming the silver medal.

Freestyle record 

! colspan="7"| Senior Freestyle Matches
|-
!  Res.
!  Record
!  Opponent
!  Score
!  Date
!  Event
!  Location
|-
! style=background:white colspan=7 |
|-
|Loss
|55-10
|align=left| Rahman Amouzad
|style="font-size:88%"|8-13
|style="font-size:88%" rowspan=1|September 18, 2022
|style="font-size:88%" rowspan=5|2022 World Wrestling Championships
|style="text-align:left;font-size:88%;" rowspan=5| Belgrade, Serbia
|-
|Win
|55-9
|align=left| Sebastian Rivera
|style="font-size:88%"|TF 10-0
|style="font-size:88%" rowspan=4|September 17, 2022
|-
|Win
|54-9
|align=left| Bajrang Punia
|style="font-size:88%"|TF 10-0
|-
|Win
|53-9
|align=left| Vladimir Dubov
|style="font-size:88%"|TF 10-0
|-
|Win
|52-9
|align=left| Vazgen Tevanyan
|style="font-size:88%"|4-0
|-
! style=background:white colspan=7 |
|-
|Win
|51-9
|align=left| Adlan Askarov
|style="font-size:88%"|TF 15–5
|style="font-size:88%" rowspan=3|July 18, 2022
|style="font-size:88%" rowspan=3|2022 Zouhaier Sghaier Ranking Series
|style="text-align:left;font-size:88%;" rowspan=3| Tunis, Tunisia
|-
|Loss
|50-9
|align=left| Sujeet Sujeet
|style="font-size:88%"|2–8
|-
|Win
|50-8
|align=left| Agustin Destribats
|style="font-size:88%"|9–2
|-
! style=background:white colspan=7 |
|-
|Win
|49-8
|align=left| Evan Henderson
|style="font-size:88%"|TF 14–4
|style="font-size:88%" rowspan=2|June 8, 2022
|style="font-size:88%" rowspan=2|2022 Final X: New York
|style="text-align:left;font-size:88%;" rowspan=2| New York, New York
|-
|Win
|48-8
|align=left| Evan Henderson
|style="font-size:88%"|11–9
|-
|Win
|47-8
|align=left| Ian Parker
|style="font-size:88%"|TF 10–0
|style="font-size:88%" rowspan=2|May 21–23, 2022
|style="font-size:88%" rowspan=2|2022 US World Team Trials Challenge
|style="text-align:left;font-size:88%;" rowspan=2|
 Coralville, Iowa
|-
|Win
|46-8
|align=left| Luke Pletcher
|style="font-size:88%"|TF 10–0
|-
! style=background:white colspan=7 |
|-
|Loss
|45-8
|align=left| Vazgen Tevanyan
|style="font-size:88%"|1–5
|style="font-size:88%" rowspan=2|October 3, 2021
|style="font-size:88%" rowspan=2|2021 World Championships
|style="text-align:left;font-size:88%;" rowspan=2| Oslo, Norway
|-
|Win
|45-7
|align=left| Colin Realbuto
|style="font-size:88%"|TF 10–0
|-
! style=background:white colspan=7 |
|-
|Win
|44-7
|align=left| Joseph McKenna
|style="font-size:88%"|TF 12–2
|style="font-size:88%" rowspan=3|September 12, 2021
|style="font-size:88%" rowspan=4|2021 US World Team Trials
|style="text-align:left;font-size:88%;" rowspan=4| Lincoln, Nebraska
|-
|Win
|43-7
|align=left| Joseph McKenna
|style="font-size:88%"|5–2
|-
|Loss
|42-7
|align=left| Joseph McKenna
|style="font-size:88%"|7–8
|-
|Win
|42-6
|align=left| Luke Pletcher
|style="font-size:88%"|TF 10–0
|style="font-size:88%"|September 11, 2021
|-
! style=background:white colspan=7 |
|-
|Win
|41-6
|align=left| Ismail Musukaev
|style="font-size:88%"|FF
|style="font-size:88%" rowspan=6|June 9, 2021
|style="font-size:88%" rowspan=6|2021 Poland Open
|style="text-align:left;font-size:88%;" rowspan=6|
 Warsaw, Poland
|-
|Win
|40-6
|align=left| Eduard Grigorew
|style="font-size:88%"|7–4
|-
|Win
|39-6
|align=left| Joseph McKenna
|style="font-size:88%"|TF 15–4
|-
|Win
|38-6
|align=left| Krzysztof Bieńkowski
|style="font-size:88%"|INJ
|-
|Loss
|37–6
|align=left| Ismail Musukaev
|style="font-size:88%"|6–7
|-
|Win
|37–5
|align=left| Eduard Grigorew
|style="font-size:88%"|9–3
|-
! style=background:white colspan=7 |
|-
|Loss
|36–5
|style="text-align:left"| Nick Lee
|style="font-size:88%"|8–16
|style="font-size:88%" rowspan=4|April 2–3, 2021
|style="font-size:88%" rowspan=4|2020 US Olympic Team Trials
|style="text-align:left;font-size:88%;" rowspan=4| Fort Worth, Texas
|-
|Win
|36–4
|style="text-align:left"| Mitch McKee
|style="font-size:88%"|TF 14–4
|-
|Loss
|35–4
|style="text-align:left"| Jordan Oliver
|style="font-size:88%"|4–4
|-
|Win
|35–3
|style="text-align:left"| Frank Molinaro
|style="font-size:88%"|TF 10–0
|-
|Win
|34–3
|style="text-align:left"| Matt Kolodzik
|style="font-size:88%"|9–6
|style="font-size:88%"|March 5, 2021
|style="font-size:88%"|The East Coast Clash: NJRTC vs. Spartan Combat RTC
|style="text-align:left;font-size:88%;" |
 Allentown, Pennsylvania
|-
! style=background:white colspan=7 | 
|-
|Win
|33–3
|style="text-align:left"| Pat Lugo
|style="font-size:88%"|7–2
|style="font-size:88%" rowspan=3|February 10–11, 2021
|style="font-size:88%" rowspan=3|2021 America's Cup
|style="text-align:left;font-size:88%;" rowspan=3|
 Concord, North Carolina
|-
|Win
|32–3
|style="text-align:left"| Mitch McKee
|style="font-size:88%"|14–10
|-
|Win
|31–3
|style="text-align:left"| Mitch McKee
|style="font-size:88%"|TF 11–0
|-
! style=background:white colspan=7 | 
|-
|Win
|30–3
|style="text-align:left"| James Green
|style="font-size:88%"|5–0
|style="font-size:88%" rowspan=4|January 16, 2021
|style="font-size:88%" rowspan=4|Grand Prix de France Henri Deglane 2021
|style="text-align:left;font-size:88%;" rowspan=4|
 Nice, France
|-
|Win
|29–3
|style="text-align:left"| Vladimer Khinchegashvili
|style="font-size:88%"|TF 13–2
|-
|Win
|28–3
|style="text-align:left"| Krzysztof Bieńkowski
|style="font-size:88%"|TF 10–0
|-
|Win
|27–3
|style="text-align:left"| Quentin Sticker
|style="font-size:88%"|TF 13–2
|-
! style=background:white colspan=7 |
|-
|Win
|26–3
|style="text-align:left"| Anthony Ashnault
|style="font-size:88%"|TF 10–0
|style="font-size:88%"|January 8, 2021
|style="font-size:88%"|SCRTC I
|style="text-align:left;font-size:88%;" |
 Austin, Texas
|-
! style=background:white colspan=7 |
|-
|Win
|25–3
|style="text-align:left"| Tariq Wilson
|style="font-size:88%"|TF 11–0
|style="font-size:88%" rowspan=4|December 4–5, 2020
|style="font-size:88%" rowspan=4|FloWrestling RTC Cup
|style="text-align:left;font-size:88%;" rowspan=4| Austin, Texas
|-
|Win
|24–3
|style="text-align:left"| James Green
|style="font-size:88%"|4–4
|-
|Win
|23–3
|style="text-align:left"| James Green
|style="font-size:88%"|3–3
|-
|Win
|22–3
|style="text-align:left"| Sammy Sasso
|style="font-size:88%"|TF 12–2
|-
! style=background:white colspan=7 | 
|-
|Exhib.
|
|style="text-align:left"| Vladimer Khinchegashvili
|style="font-size:88%"|4–4
|style="font-size:88%"|September 17, 2020
|style="font-size:88%"|2020 Beat The Streets
|style="text-align:left;font-size:88%;" |
 New York City
|-
! style=background:white colspan=7 |
|-
|Win
|21–3
|style="text-align:left"| Mauricio Sanchez
|style="font-size:88%"|4–0
|style="font-size:88%"rowspan=4|March 6–9, 2020
|style="font-size:88%"rowspan=4|2020 Pan American Wrestling Championships
|style="text-align:left;font-size:88%;"rowspan=4|
 Ottawa, Canada
|-
|Win
|20–3
|style="text-align:left"| Agustin Destribats
|style="font-size:88%"|7–4
|-
|Win
|19–3
|style="text-align:left"| Jose Rodriguez
|style="font-size:88%"|9–2
|-
|Win
|18–3
|style="text-align:left"| Luis Orta
|style="font-size:88%"|Fall
|-
! style=background:white colspan=7 | 
|-
|Win
|17–3
|style="text-align:left"| Bryce Meredith
|style="font-size:88%"|TF 10–0
|style="font-size:88%" rowspan=5|December 20–22, 2019 
|style="font-size:88%" rowspan=5|2019 U.S Senior National Championships
|style="text-align:left;font-size:88%;" rowspan=5|
 Las Vegas, Nevada
|-
|Loss
|16–3
|style="text-align:left"| Joseph McKenna
|style="font-size:88%"|5–5
|-
|Win
|16–2
|style="text-align:left"| Ben Whitford
|style="font-size:88%"|11–3
|-
|Win
|15–2
|style="text-align:left"| Nick Dardanes
|style="font-size:88%"|TF 10–0
|-
|Win
|14–2
|style="text-align:left"| Mario Mason
|style="font-size:88%"|TF 10–0
|-
! style=background:white colspan=7 |
|-
|Loss
|13–2
|style="text-align:left"| Zain Retherford
|style="font-size:88%"|1–2
|style="font-size:88%"|September 2, 2019
|style="font-size:88%"|2019 Final X Wrestle-Off: Yianni vs Zain
|style="text-align:left;font-size:88%;"|
 Wilkes-Barre, Pennsylvania
|-
! style=background:white colspan=7 |
|-
|Win
|13–1
|style="text-align:left"| Gor Ogannesyan
|style="font-size:88%"|9–8
|style="font-size:88%"rowspan=3|August 2–4, 2019
|style="font-size:88%"rowspan=3|2019 Ziolkowski, Pytlasinski, Poland Open
|style="text-align:left;font-size:88%;"rowspan=3|
 Warsaw, Poland
|-
|Win
|12–1
|style="text-align:left"| Sayatbek Okasov
|style="font-size:88%"|TF 11–0
|-
|Win
|11–1
|style="text-align:left"| Shaohua Yuan
|style="font-size:88%"|TF 10–0
|-
! style=background:white colspan=7 |
|-
|Win
|10–1
|style="text-align:left"| Haji Mohamad Ali
|style="font-size:88%"|Fall
|style="font-size:88%"rowspan=4|July 11–14, 2019
|style="font-size:88%"rowspan=4|2019 Grand Prix Yaşar Doğu
|style="text-align:left;font-size:88%;"rowspan=4|
 Istanbul, Turkey
|-
|Win
|9–1
|style="text-align:left"| Ismail Musukaev
|style="font-size:88%"|9–9
|-
|Win
|8–1
|style="text-align:left"| Ali Rahimzade
|style="font-size:88%"|TF 13–2
|-
|Win
|7–1
|style="text-align:left"| Zain Retherford
|style="font-size:88%"|9–5
|-
! style=background:white colspan=7 | 
|-
|NC
|
|style="text-align:left"| Zain Retherford
|style="font-size:88%"|6–6
|style="font-size:88%" rowspan=2|June 7–8, 2019
|style="font-size:88%" rowspan=2|2019 Final X: Rutgers
|style="text-align:left;font-size:88%;" rowspan=2|
 New Brunswick, New Jersey
|-
|Loss
|6–1
|style="text-align:left"| Zain Retherford
|style="font-size:88%"|4–10
|-
! style=background:white colspan=7 | 
|-
|Exhib.
|
|style="text-align:left"| Bajrang Punia
|style="font-size:88%"|10–8
|style="font-size:88%"|May 6, 2019
|style="font-size:88%"|2019 Beat The Streets: Grapple at the Garden
|style="text-align:left;font-size:88%;" |
 New York City
|-
! style=background:white colspan=7 | 
|-
|Win
|6–0
|style="text-align:left"| Zain Retherford
|style="font-size:88%"|6–4
|style="font-size:88%" rowspan=6|April 24–27, 2019 
|style="font-size:88%" rowspan=6|2019 US Open National Championships
|style="text-align:left;font-size:88%;" rowspan=6|
 Las Vegas, Nevada
|-
|Win
|5–0
|style="text-align:left"| Jordan Oliver
|style="font-size:88%"|TF 16–5
|-
|Win
|4–0
|style="text-align:left"| Frank Molinaro 
|style="font-size:88%"|10–3
|-
|Win
|3–0
|style="text-align:left"| Nick Dardanes
|style="font-size:88%"|TF 10–0
|-
|Win
|2–0
|style="text-align:left"| Chase Farr
|style="font-size:88%"|TF 14–4
|-
|Win
|1–0
|style="text-align:left"| Corey Shie
|style="font-size:88%"|7–4
|-

NCAA record 

! colspan="8"| NCAA Championships Matches
|-
!  Res.
!  Record
!  Opponent
!  Score
!  Date
!  Event
|-
! style=background:lighgrey colspan=6 |Start of 2021–2022 Season (junior year)
|-
! style=background:lighgrey colspan=6 |End of 2018–2019 Season (sophomore year)
|-
! style=background:white colspan=6 |2019 NCAA Championships  at 141 lbs
|-
|Win
|66–1
|style="text-align:left"|Joseph McKenna
|style="font-size:88%"|SV-1 6–4
|style="font-size:88%" rowspan=5|March 21–23, 2019
|style="font-size:88%" rowspan=5|2019 NCAA Division I Wrestling Championships
|-
|Win
|65–1
|style="text-align:left"|Jaydin Eierman
|style="font-size:88%"|6–5
|-
|Win
|64–1
|style="text-align:left"|Dom Demas
|style="font-size:88%"|5–1
|-
|Win
|63–1
|style="text-align:left"|Chad Red
|style="font-size:88%"|7–3
|-
|Win
|62–1
|style="text-align:left"|Pete Lipari
|style="font-size:88%"|10–5
|-
! style=background:white colspan=6 |2019 EIWA Championships  at 141 lbs
|-
|Win
|61–1
|style="text-align:left"| Nick Gil
|style="font-size:88%"|8–2
|style="font-size:88%" rowspan=4|March 8–9, 2019
|style="font-size:88%" rowspan=4|2019 EIWA Conference Championships
|-
|Win
|60–1
|style="text-align:left"| Anthony Sparacio
|style="font-size:88%"|MD 14–2
|-
|Win
|59–1
|style="text-align:left"| Wil Gil
|style="font-size:88%"|TF 18–3
|-
|Win
|58–1
|style="text-align:left"| Ryan Friedman
|style="font-size:88%"|Fall
|-
|Win
|57–1
|style="text-align:left"| Joseph McKenna
|style="font-size:88%"|7–5
|style="font-size:88%"|February 22, 2019
|style="font-size:88%"|Ohio State – Cornell Dual
|-
|Win
|56–1
|style="text-align:left"| AC Headlee
|style="font-size:88%"|9–2
|style="font-size:88%"|February 16, 2019
|style="font-size:88%"|Cornell – North Carolina Dual
|-
|Win
|55–1
|style="text-align:left"| Mitch Moore
|style="font-size:88%"|6–1
|style="font-size:88%"|February 15, 2019
|style="font-size:88%"|Cornell – Virginia Tech Dual
|-
|Win
|54–1
|style="text-align:left"| Marshall Keller
|style="font-size:88%"|MD 14–6
|style="font-size:88%"|February 9, 2019
|style="font-size:88%"|Princeton – Cornell Dual
|-
|Win
|53–1
|style="text-align:left"| AJ Vindici
|style="font-size:88%"|TF 16–1
|style="font-size:88%"|February 8, 2019
|style="font-size:88%"|Pennsylvania – Cornell Dual
|-
|Win
|52–1
|style="text-align:left"| Kyle Shoop
|style="font-size:88%"|Fall
|style="font-size:88%"|February 2, 2019
|style="font-size:88%"|Lock Haven – Cornell Dual
|-
|Win
|51–1
|style="text-align:left"| Ryan Friedman
|style="font-size:88%"|Fall
|style="font-size:88%" rowspan=2|January 26, 2019
|style="font-size:88%"|Cornell – Harvard Dual
|-
|Win
|50–1
|style="text-align:left"| Colin Realbuto
|style="font-size:88%"|TF 22–4
|style="font-size:88%"|Cornell – Brown Dual
|-
|Win
|49–1
|style="text-align:left"| Ryan Pomrinca
|style="font-size:88%"|13–7
|style="font-size:88%"|January 12, 2019
|style="font-size:88%"|Cornell – Lehigh Dual
|-
|Win
|48–1
|style="text-align:left"| Jaydin Eierman
|style="font-size:88%"|3–1
|style="font-size:88%" rowspan=2|December 30, 2018
|style="font-size:88%"|Cornell – Missouri Dual
|-
|Win
|47–1
|style="text-align:left"| Cole Weaver
|style="font-size:88%"|TF 23–4
|style="font-size:88%"|Cor–nell – Indiana Dual
|-
! style=background:white colspan=6 |2018 South Beach Individual  at 141 lbs
|-
|Win
|46–1
|style="text-align:left"| Kyle Luigs
|style="font-size:88%"|Fall
|style="font-size:88%" rowspan=4|December 29, 2018
|style="font-size:88%" rowspan=3|2018 South Beach Individual
|-
|Win
|45–1
|style="text-align:left"| Jaime Hernandez
|style="font-size:88%"|MD 18–4
|-
|Win
|44–1
|style="text-align:left"| Alex Hrisopoulos
|style="font-size:88%"|Fall
|-
|Win
|43–1
|style="text-align:left"| Sam Turner
|style="font-size:88%"|MD 14–6
|style="font-size:88%"|Cornell – Wyoming Dual
|-
|Win
|42–1
|style="text-align:left"| Josh Alber
|style="font-size:88%"|MD 12–2
|style="font-size:88%"|December 16, 2018
|style="font-size:88%"|Cornell – Northern Iowa Dual
|-
! style=background:white colspan=6 |2018 Mat Town Open I  at 141 lbs
|-
|Win
|41–1
|style="text-align:left"| Ryan Moore
|style="font-size:88%"|FF
|style="font-size:88%" rowspan=4|November 25, 2018
|style="font-size:88%" rowspan=4|2018 Mat Town Open I
|-
|Win
|40-1
|style="text-align:left"| Mason Lindenmuth
|style="font-size:88%"|TF 17-1
|-
|Win
|39-1
|style="text-align:left"| CJ Manley
|style="font-size:88%"|Fall
|-
|Win
|38-1
|style="text-align:left"| Marlon Argneta
|style="font-size:88%"|Fall
|-
! style=background:lighgrey colspan=6 |Start of 2018–2019 Season (sophomore year)
|-
! style=background:lighgrey colspan=6 |End of 2017–2018 Season (freshman year)
|-
! style=background:white colspan=6 |2018 NCAA Championships  at 141 lbs
|-
|Win
|37–1
|style="text-align:left"|Bryce Meredith
|style="font-size:88%"|7–4
|style="font-size:88%" rowspan=5|March 15–17, 2018
|style="font-size:88%" rowspan=5|2018 NCAA Division I Wrestling Championships
|-
|Win
|36–1
|style="text-align:left"|Jaydin Eierman 
|style="font-size:88%"|SV-1 6–4
|-
|Win
|35–1
|style="text-align:left"|Dean Heil
|style="font-size:88%"|6–5
|-
|Win
|34–1
|style="text-align:left"|Nick Gil
|style="font-size:88%"|MD 13–4
|-
|Win
|33–1
|style="text-align:left"|Nick Zanetta
|style="font-size:88%"|MD 10–1
|-
! style=background:white colspan=6 |2018 EIWA Championships  at 141 lbs
|-
|Win
|32–1
|style="text-align:left"| Tyler Smith
|style="font-size:88%"|MD 17–9
|style="font-size:88%" rowspan=4|March 3–4, 2018
|style="font-size:88%" rowspan=4|2018 EIWA Conference Championships
|-
|Win
|31–1
|style="text-align:left"| Nick Gil
|style="font-size:88%"|9–4
|-
|Win
|30–1
|style="text-align:left"| Pat D'Arcy
|style="font-size:88%"|TF 18–3
|-
|Win
|29–1
|style="text-align:left"| Zeke Salvo
|style="font-size:88%"|Fall
|-
|Win
|28–1
|style="text-align:left"| AC Headlee
|style="font-size:88%"|7–6
|style="font-size:88%"|February 16, 2018
|style="font-size:88%"|North Carolina – Cornell Dual
|-
|Win
|27–1
|style="text-align:left"| Jordan Reich
|style="font-size:88%"|Fall
|style="font-size:88%"rowspan=2|February 10, 2018
|style="font-size:88%"|Cornell – Princeton Dual
|-
|Win
|26–1
|style="text-align:left"| FF
|style="font-size:88%"|FF
|style="font-size:88%"|Cornell – Pennsylvania Dual
|-
|Win
|25–1
|style="text-align:left"| Julian Flores
|style="font-size:88%"|Fall
|style="font-size:88%"|February 9, 2018
|style="font-size:88%"|Cornell – Drexel Dual
|-
|Win
|24–1
|style="text-align:left"| Kyle Shoop
|style="font-size:88%"|TF 19–3
|style="font-size:88%"|February 4, 2018
|style="font-size:88%"|Cornell – Lock Haven Dual
|-
|Win
|23–1
|style="text-align:left"| Valentine Miele
|style="font-size:88%"|Fall
|style="font-size:88%"|February 3, 2018
|style="font-size:88%"|Columbia – Cornell Dual
|-
|Win
|22–1
|style="text-align:left"| Trevor Tarsi 
|style="font-size:88%"|TF 24–8
|style="font-size:88%"rowspan=2|January 27, 2018
|style="font-size:88%"|Harvard – Cornell Dual
|-
|Win
|21–1
|style="text-align:left"| Ezekiel Salvo
|style="font-size:88%"|Fall
|style="font-size:88%"|Brown – Cornell Dual
|-
|Win
|20–1
|style="text-align:left"| Luke Karam
|style="font-size:88%"|MD 8–0
|style="font-size:88%"|January 19, 2018
|style="font-size:88%"|Lehigh – Cornell Dual
|-
|Loss
|19–1
|style="text-align:left"| Jaydin Eierman
|style="font-size:88%"|6–9
|style="font-size:88%"rowspan=2|December 30, 2017
|style="font-size:88%"|Missouri – Cornell Dual
|-
|Win
|19–0
|style="text-align:left"| Blake Rettell
|style="font-size:88%"|Fall
|style="font-size:88%"|Cornell – Kent State Dual
|-
|Win
|18–0
|style="text-align:left"| Thomas Thorn
|style="font-size:88%"|Fall
|style="font-size:88%"rowspan=2|December 29, 2017
|style="font-size:88%"|Cornell – Minnesota Dual
|-
|Win
|17–0
|style="text-align:left"| Sam Hampton
|style="font-size:88%"|Fall
|style="font-size:88%"|Cornell – North Dakota State Dual
|-
|Win
|16–0
|style="text-align:left"| Blake Rettell
|style="font-size:88%"|Fall
|style="font-size:88%"|December 18, 2017
|style="font-size:88%"|Cornell – Buffalo Dual
|-
! style=background:white colspan=6 |2017 Cliff Keen Las Vegas Invitational  at 141 lbs
|-
|Win
|15–0
|style="text-align:left"| Josh Alber
|style="font-size:88%"|8–2
|style="font-size:88%" rowspan=5|December 1–2, 2017
|style="font-size:88%" rowspan=5|2017 Cliff Keen Las Vegas Invitational
|-
|Win
|14–0
|style="text-align:left"| Bryce Meredith
|style="font-size:88%"|4–2
|-
|Win
|13–0
|style="text-align:left"| Nick Zanetta
|style="font-size:88%"|MD 9–1
|-
|Win
|12–0
|style="text-align:left"| Sal Profaci
|style="font-size:88%"|10–4
|-
|Win
|11–0
|style="text-align:left"| Sa'Derian Perry
|style="font-size:88%"|MD 11–2
|-
! style=background:white colspan=6 |2017 NYS Intercollegiate Championships  at 141 lbs
|-
|Win
|10–0
|style="text-align:left"| Corey Shie
|style="font-size:88%"|TF 19–4
|style="font-size:88%" rowspan=4|November 19, 2017
|style="font-size:88%" rowspan=4|2017 NYS Intercollegiate Championships
|-
|Win
|9–0
|style="text-align:left"| Michael Venosa
|style="font-size:88%"|MD 16–3
|-
|Win
|8–0
|style="text-align:left"| Christian Briody
|style="font-size:88%"|Fall
|-
|Win
|7–0
|style="text-align:left"| Paul Brohan
|style="font-size:88%"|TF 24–5
|-
|Win
|6–0
|style="text-align:left"| Josh Alber
|style="font-size:88%"|5–2
|style="font-size:88%"|November 17, 2017
|style="font-size:88%"|Northern Iowa – Cornell Dual
|-
! style=background:white colspan=6 |2017 Jonathan Kaloust Bearcat Open  at 141 lbs
|-
|Win
|5–0
|style="text-align:left"| AJ Jaffe
|style="font-size:88%"|MD 13–4
|style="font-size:88%" rowspan=5|November 12, 2017
|style="font-size:88%" rowspan=5|2017 Jonathan Kaloust Bearcat Open
|-
|Win
|4–0
|style="text-align:left"| Nick Lee
|style="font-size:88%"|12–7
|-
|Win
|3–0
|style="text-align:left"| Jacob Lizak
|style="font-size:88%"|Fall
|-
|Win
|2–0
|style="text-align:left"| Matt Swanson
|style="font-size:88%"|TF 20–5
|-
|Win
|1–0
|style="text-align:left"| Jimmy Pawelski
|style="font-size:88%"|TF 24–9
|-
! style=background:lighgrey colspan=6 |Start of 2017–2018 Season (freshman year)
|-

Stats 

!  Season
!  Year
!  School
!  Rank
!  Weigh Class
!  Record
!  Win
!  Bonus
|-
|2023
|Senior
|Cornell University
|#1 (1st)
|rowspan=2|149
|16-1
|94.12%
|75.66%
|-
|2022
|Junior
|Cornell University
|#1 (1st)
|28-0
|100.00%
|64.28%
|-
|2019
|Sophomore
|Cornell University
|#1 (1st)
|rowspan=2|141
|29–0
|100.00%
|58.62%
|-
|2018
|Freshman
|Cornell University
|#3 (1st)
|37–1
|97.37%
|68.42%
|-
|colspan=5 style="background:LIGHTGREY"|Career
|style="background:LIGHTGREY"|110-2
|style="background:LIGHTGREY"|98.21%
|style="background:LIGHTGREY"|70.11%
|}

References

1999 births
Living people
People from New York (state)
American male sport wrestlers
Cornell Big Red wrestlers
Pan American Wrestling Championships medalists